Hungary competed at the 2022 European Athletics Championships in Munich, Germany, between 15 and 21 August 2022

Medallists

Results

Hungary entered the following athletes.

Men
Track and road events

Field events

Women
Track and road events

Field events

Combined events – Heptathlon

References

External links
European Athletics Championships

Nations at the 2022 European Athletics Championships
European Athletics Championships
2022